John Henderson Lamb (February 16, 1873 – March 3, 1955) was an American football coach.  He was the first head football coach the Kansas State Normal School—now known as Emporia State University—in Emporia, Kansas, serving for one season, in 1900, and compiling a record of 5–3–1.  Emporia State's football team began in 1893 but played without an official head coach for the first seven seasons.

Lamb was born on February 16, 1873, in Bellefonte, Pennsylvania, and moved to Kansas with his father to homestead.  He graduated from the College of Emporia and later trained at the Princeton Theological Seminary to become a Presbyterian minister.  Lamb married Martha Rannek in Jacksonville, Illinois on May 15, 1902.  He died on March 3, 1955, at a hospital in Frederick, Oklahoma.

Head coaching record

References

External  links
 

1873 births
1955 deaths
American Presbyterian ministers
Emporia State Hornets football coaches
College of Emporia alumni
Princeton Theological Seminary alumni
People from Bellefonte, Pennsylvania